Psychology (2005) is the first album by Discover America (Chris Staples), on Tooth & Nail Records. It was performed, produced, and recorded/engineered by Chris Staples.

Track listing
(all songs written by Chris Staples except where noted)
 "Call It in the Air" – 3:28
 "1986" (Staples / Gio Lugo) – 3:49
 "From the 100th Floor" – 3:14
 "Stark Honesty" – 3:31
 "Green Eyes" – 3:54
 "Tight Rope Walker" – 4:10
 "Phantom Treasure" – 3:27
 "Shiny Teeth" – 4:31
 "The Halves That Make Us Whole" – 4:41
 "Everything Changes" (Staples / Adrien Hulet) – 3:48

References

2005 albums
Tooth & Nail Records albums